Little Odessa may refer to:

 Brighton Beach in Brooklyn, New York City
 Little Odessa (film), a 1995 American crime drama film